George Burwell Maughan (May 8, 1910 – June 16, 2003) was a Canadian boxer who competed in the 1932 Summer Olympics. He was Canada's flagbearer.

He was born in Toronto, Ontario; he lived in Montreal, Quebec, and died in Guadalajara, Mexico.

In 1932 he finished fourth of the heavyweight class. He was not able to fight in the bronze medal bout against Frederick Feary.

External links

1910 births
2003 deaths
Boxers from Toronto
Heavyweight boxers
Olympic boxers of Canada
Boxers at the 1932 Summer Olympics
Canadian male boxers